Daniel Lawrence Newman (born 1963) is a British writer, scholar and translator of Arabic literature. Newman is currently the head of the Arabic department at the University of Durham and Director of the MA programme in English-Arabic Translation and Interpreting.  He serves as a special advisor to the Islamic Criminal Justice Project at the Centre for Criminal Law & Justice, Durham Law School, and served as a member of council at the British Society for Middle Eastern Studies from 2008 to 2012.

Academic career 
Newman received his doctorate from the School of Oriental and African Studies (SOAS), University of London.

Newman's research in Arabic studies centres on linguistics (phonetics and dialectology) and literature. He is a specialist on the 19th-century Nahda (Arab Renaissance) movement in Egypt and Tunisia and has published extensively on this topic. He is also involved in a long-term project on mediaeval Arabic erotic literature which will result in the edition and translation of original manuscripts.

Newman has translated several works of Arabic literature, both from the pre-modern and modern era. These include Takhlis al-Ibriz fi Talkhis Bariz by Rifa'a al-Tahtawi (under the title An Imam in Paris) and Modern Arabic Short Stories. In 2008, he was the co-recipient of the Republic of Tunisia International Prize for Islamic Studies for the book Muslim Women in Law and Society.

Since 2011, Newman has been cited as an expert on the Middle East for Al Jazeera and the Voice of America, among others.

Books

Author 
 A to Z of Arabic-English-Arabic Translation, London, Saqi Books, 2013 (co-authored with R. Husni).
 Modern Arabic Short Stories: A Bilingual Reader - Twelve Stories by Contemporary Masters from Morocco to Iraq, London, Saqi Books, 2008 (co-authored with R. Husni).
 Arabic-English Thematic Lexicon, Routledge, 2007.
 Muslim Women in Law and Society: Annotated translation of al-Tahir al-Haddad’s Imra ‘tuna fi ‘l-sharia wa ‘l-mujtama, with an introduction, Routledge, 2007 (co-authored with R. Husni).
 An Imam in Paris: Al-Tahtawi's Visit to France (1826-1831), London, Saqi Books, 2004 (2nd revised edition 2011).
 Elsevier’s Dictionary of Ports and Shipping (English, French, Spanish, Italian, Portuguese, Dutch, German), Amsterdam, Elsevier, 1993 (co-authored with J. Van der Tuin).

Editor 
 Proceedings of the 1st Annual International Conference on Language, Literature & Linguistics (L3 2012), Singapore, 2012.
 Maritime Terminology: Issues in Communication and Translation. Proceedings of the First International Conference on Maritime Terminology, Brussels, 1999 (with M. Van Campenhoudt).

See also
List of Arabic-English translators

References

External links
•Arabic Erotica

1963 births
Living people
Linguists from the United Kingdom
Nahda
Academics of Durham University
British translators
Alumni of SOAS University of London